Dieter Schnebel (14 March 1930 – 20 May 2018) was a German composer, theologian and musicologist. He composed orchestral music, chamber music, vocal music and stage works. From 1976 until his retirement in 1995, Schnebel served as professor of experimental music at the Hochschule der Künste, Berlin.

Career
Schnebel was born in Lahr/Baden. He began general private music studies with Wilhelm Siebler from 1942 until 1945, when he started piano lessons with Wilhelm Resch, and continued study with him until 1949 at the age of 19. He continued with music history through 1952, under Eric Doflein. Simultaneously he began to study composition, from 1950, with Ernst Krenek, Theodor W. Adorno and Pierre Boulez, among others. He entered formal studies at the University of Tübingen where he took musicology with Walter Gerstenberg, as well as theology, philosophy and further piano studies. In 1955, he left with a degree in theology, but with a dissertation about Arnold Schoenberg. Soon after, he married Camilla Riegger in 1956, and the couple had a son and daughter. Schnebel became a minister, and taught theology and religion until 1963 when he began teaching philosophy and psychology. After his first wife died, he underwent a period of psychoanalysis. In 1970 he married translator Iris von Kaschnitz (1928–2014), daughter of Marie Luise Kaschnitz, and began teaching religious studies and music in Munich, which he continued until 1976. His students included Australian composer Norma Tyer. In 1976, he began teaching in Berlin as a professor of experimental music and music research, a chair created for him. He held it until his retirement in 1995.

Invited by Walter Fink, he was the sixth composer featured in the annual Komponistenporträt of the Rheingau Musik Festival in 1996, where his Schau-Stücke for voices and gestures premiered.

Schnebel died of a heart ailment in Berlin on 20 May 2018 at the age of 88. His and his wife's grave an in Dahlem Cemetery.

Cycles and style 
Schnebel composed several cycles of works, sometimes over a long time. One of them was called Versuche (Essays), consisting of four works written 1953 to 1956. They concern serial techniques, exploring space by placing performers at separate positions. His religious music includes a cycle Für Stimmen (...missa est) (For voices ...), consisting of four works written 1956 to 1969). They use the human voice and organ in experimental settings of prayers and biblical texts. A cycle Produktionsprozesse is a group of compositions related to "language and body" which concerns the physical sound production, with the performers utilizing speech and breathing organs in unusual ways.

His earliest works were strongly influenced by his fellow Darmstadt students Karlheinz Stockhausen, about whose early works he wrote an extended essay, and Mauricio Kagel, about whom he edited a book. Starting in 1959, he also came under the influence of John Cage.)

Schnebel made arrangements of works by Bach, Beethoven, Webern and Wagner, called Re-Visions, sometimes using their traditional concepts to reflect new techniques and different ways of looking at them.

Awards 
Schnebel's awards include the Arts Prize of Lahr in 1991. He received the first European Church Music Prize in Schwäbisch Gmünd the same year. He was a member of the Berlin Akademie der Künste from 1991, and of the Bayerische Akademie der Schönen Künste since 1996. In 2015, he was awarded the Bundesverdienstkreuz am Bande.

Works 
Schnebel's works are held by the German National Library. Many of them are published by Schott Music.

Music with orchestra 
 Compositio (1955–56, rev. 1964/1965)
 Orchestra / Symphonische Musik für mobile Musiker (1974–1977)
 Canones (1975–1977; 1993/1994)
 Schubert-Phantasie (Re-Visionen I5, for divided orchestra and voices) (1978, rev. 1989 as Blendwerk, for string orchestra)
 Thanatos-Eros (Traditione III1), symphonic variations for large orchestra (1979–82, rev.1984–85)
 Sinfonie-Stücke (Traditione III2) (1984–85)
 Missa, Dahlem Mass for four solo voices, two mixed choirs, orchestra and organ (1984–1987)
 Mahler-Moment, for strings (1985)
 Sinfonie X (Tradition VI) (1987–1992; 2004/2005)
 Mozart-Moment (1988/1989)
 Schumann-Moment (Re-Visionen II2, for voices, winds, harp, and percussion (1989)
 Verdi-Moment (Re-Visionen II5, for orchestra (1989)
 St. Jago (Tradition IV2, 3 speakers, 4 singers, and ensemble: music and images to Heinrich von Kleist (1989–1991) (rev. 1995)
 Janáček-Moment (Re-Visionen II1), for orchestra (1991)
 Totentanz, ballet-oratorio for two speakers, soprano, bass, choir, orchestra and live electronic (1992–1994)
 inter, for chamber orchestra (1994)
 O Liebe! – süßer Tod..., five sacred songs after Johann Sebastian Bach for mezzo-soprano, chamber choir, and small orchestra (1995)
 Ekstasis for soprano, speaker, two children's voices, percussion, choir and large orchestra (1996/1997; 2001/2002)

Chamber music 
 Analysis, for strings and percussion (1953)
 Stücke, for string quartet or string octet (1954–55)
 Fragment, for chamber ensemble and voice obligato (1955)
 Das Urteil after Franz Kafka, Raummusik für Instrumente, Stimmen und sonstige Schallquellen (Space music for instruments, voices and other sound sources) (1959, rev. 1990)
 Glossolalie (1959–61), instructions for composition
 Glossolalie 61 (1959–1961)
 Glossolalie 94 (1994)
 Maulwerke (1968–74); staged in 1977 by Achim Freyer at the Musiktheaterwerkstatt Wiesbaden Version 2010
 Körpersprache / Organkomposition (Body Language / Organ Composition), for 3–9 players (1979/1980)
 Memento, for voice and accordion (1981)
 Montiano-Song, for one or more voices and instruments (1983)
 Beethoven-Symphonie (Re-Visionen I2), for chamber ensemble (1985)
 Metamorphosenmusik, for voice and chamber ensemble (1986/1987)
 Metamorphosen des Ovid or Die Bewegung von den Rändern zur Mitte hin und umgekehrt, incidental music for 11 voices and 11 strings (1986–87)
 Mit diesen Händen, for voice and cello with curved bow (1992)
 Baumzucht (J. P. Hebel), musical reading after Johann Peter Hebel for speaker and chamber ensemble (1992/1995)
 Schau-Stücke (Body Études) (1995)
Keine grossen Sprünge, for two performers
Kopfschütteln, for five performers
Schlängeln, for two performers
 Magnificat (1996/97)
 String Quartet No. 2 (2000–2007)
 Flipper, chamber music for Spielautomaten, actors, instruments and tape (2002/2003)
 String Quartet No. 3 "Im Raum" (2005–2006)
 Drei Kafka-Dramolette, Der plötzliche Spaziergang, Entschlüsse and Gib's auf! (2009)

Vocal 
Für Stimmen (… missa est): I. dt 31,6 for 12 vocal groups (1956–58), II. AMN for 7 vocal groups (1958–67), III. :! (madrasha II) for 3 choir groups and magnetic tape ad lib. (1958–68), IV. Choralvorspiele I/II for organ, side instruments, magnetic tape and amplifier (1966–69)
Maulwerke, for amplified voices and electronics (1968–74)
Körper-Sprache, for 3–9 performers (1979–80)
Bach-Contrapuncti (I, VI, XI) (Re-Visionen I1, for voices (1972–76); revised as O Liebe! – süsser Tod (1984–95)
Motetus I, for two choruses (1989–93)
"Mein Herz ruht müde", for alto voice and piano (1994)
Motetus II, for two choruses (1997–98)
Behütet ... : Psalm 121, for chorus (SSMezAATTBarBB), with organ or synthesizer ad lib. (2012)

Bibliography 

Sources

Further reading
 Gligo, Nikša. "Schrift ist Musik? Ein Beitrag zur Aktualisierung eines nur anscheinend veralteten Widerspruchs". International Review of the Aesthetics and Sociology of Music 18 (1987), 1, pp. 145–162 (part 1); 19 (1988), 1, pp. 75–115 (part 2) (includes an analysis of Schnebel's project MO-NO: Musik zum Lesen)
 Pöllmann, Rainer, and Achim Freyer. "Zum Tod von Dieter Schnebel Ein radikaler Avantgardist". Deutschlandfunk Kultur (20 May 2018; accessed 25 May 2018). 
 Stolba, K. Marie. The Development of Western Music: A History. Boston: McGraw Hill, 1998.
 Warnaby, John. "Dieter Schnebel and His Sinfonie X". Tempo, New Series, no. 186 (September 1993), pp. 26–31.
 Weiland, Andreas. "KÖRPERSPRACHE. Eine Organkomposition von Dieter Schnebel, uraufgeführt in der Neuen Galerie in Aachen am 24. März 1986". Art in Society, No. 11 (Spring/Summer, 2011): .
 Weiland, Andreas. "Die Metamorphosen für Mezzosopran und kleines Orchester Dieter Schnebels, uraufgeführt in der Neuen Galerie in Aachen". Art in Society, No. 11 (Spring/Summer, 2011): .

External links
 
 International Composers: Dieter Schnebel Schott Music
 
 
 Dieter Schnebel in der Hochschule für Musik und Darstellende Kunst (HfMDK) Frankfurt, 23. und 24.11. 2016 / Zwischen Nostalgie und Utopie hboscaiolo.blogspot.de 2016
Dieter Schnebel at the Avant Garde Project (archive from 20 February 2009, from the original), FLAC files made from high-quality LP transcriptions

1930 births
2018 deaths
20th-century classical composers
Twelve-tone and serial composers
German classical composers
German male classical composers
Musicologists from Berlin
20th-century German composers
Members of the Academy of Arts, Berlin
People from Garmisch-Partenkirchen (district)
Recipients of the Cross of the Order of Merit of the Federal Republic of Germany
20th-century German male musicians